Eduardo Cansino Reina (March 2, 1895 – December 24, 1968) was a Spanish-born American dancer and actor of Romani descent. He was the father of actress Rita Hayworth.

Biography
Eduardo Cansino was born on March 2, 1895, in Castilleja de la Cuesta, Andalusia, Spain. His sister, Elisa, was also a dancer. 

His father, Antonio Cansino, combined classical flamenco dancing with Romani flamenco. Antonio was known worldwide for dancing the bolero. 

Eduardo's immigration to the United States was sponsored by the Stuyvesant family. In New York he performed for, instructed, and integrated into high society. 

There, he joined the Ziegfeld Follies where he met Volga Hayworth. They married in 1917. They had three children: Margarita Carmen (October 17, 1918 – May 14, 1987), Eduardo Jr. (October 13, 1919 – March 11, 1974), and Vernon (May 21, 1922 – March 23, 1974). After she began making films in Hollywood, Margarita Carmen Cansino took her mother's maiden name as her professional surname, becoming Rita Hayworth.

Death
Eduardo Cansino Sr. died in Pompano Beach, Florida, in 1968, aged 73, and is buried at Forest Lawn Memorial Park (Glendale).

Selected filmography

Golden Dawn (1930)
Dancing Pirate (1936)
The Loves of Carmen (1948)
Salome (1953)
Sombrero (1953)

References

External links

1895 births
1968 deaths
Flamenco dancers
Spanish male dancers
Spanish male film actors
Spanish male stage actors
Spanish emigrants to the United States
Vaudeville performers
Burials at Forest Lawn Memorial Park (Glendale)
Spanish people of Romani descent
People from Andalusia
Ziegfeld Follies
Cansino family